Dan Sullivan (October 22, 1935-October 4, 2022) was a widely-read American theater critic with columns in the Los Angeles Times, The New York Times, The Minneapolis Tribune, and the St. Paul Pioneer Press. He was the director of the Eugene O'Neill National Critics Institute, and co-founded the American Theater Critics Association. He was a founding member of Brave New Workshop, which for more than half a century continues to be a theater venue for satiric comedy in Minneapolis.

Career

Sullivan had a theater column in Minneapolis at a significant moment of the city's cultural history — the arrival of the Guthrie Theater. Sullivan witnessed and reported the birth of the theater itself, with its innovative design, and the founding tenure of artistic director Tyrone Guthrie.

At the New York Times, Sullivan was a theater and music critic. His focus was off-Broadway, which included for example, his reporting on The Open Theater on the pioneering Cafe Cino, after the death of its founder, on plays by Edward Albee<ref>Sullivan, Dan. "Theater: Albee's 'Bessie Smith' and 'Dream'". New York Times. October 3, 1968</ref> and Lanford Wilson, on a new play that starred Mildred Dunnock, and on a Broadway production of Hello Dolly, that starred Martha Ray.

For the New York Times, he reviewed notable productions of Minneapolis, which included plays from the Guthrie Theater, and more experimental fare, including the Firehouse Theater's production of Jack Jack, by Megan Terry. Sullivan noted:

In 1969 he became the primary theater critic for the Los Angeles Times when theater there was growing. He kept that post for 22 years. At the end of every year he would write a traditional column summarizing theater's highlights, and he would counter that with a humorous column called "Bah-Humbug Awards", which pointed out some low points. Sullivan would end his Bah-Humbug columns with a confession of mistakes that he himself had made during the year. Morgan, Camilo. "Dan Sullivan, longtime theater critic for The Times and one of the nation's most widely read, dies". USA Today. October 6, 2022.

Brave New Workshop
In Minneapolis in 1961, Sullivan, a journalism professor at the University of Minnesota, joined with Dudley Riggs, a former circus aerialist, and others to create a satirical comedy theater and coffee shop. He wrote sketches and plays to be performed by a cast of actors. Sullivan has said it was "the happiest time of my life … The companionship was wonderful, and it was great to have a gang and something to enjoy doing as a group. As young people, we were living the business life, most of us as journalists, but we also had doubts about it — sketch comedy and satire proved a release for that." Royce, Graydon Justin, Neal. "An oral history of Dudley Riggs' Brave New Workshop; How Minneapolis' first espresso coffeehouse launched a nationally known comedy institution". Minneapolis Star Tribune. September 22, 2020

A phone call from the President
President Ronald Reagan, in 1981, phoned Sullivan, the drama critic of The Los Angeles Times, asking him to give a favorable mention of the musical Turn to the Right, that Reagan's friend, Buddy Ebsen, was starring in. In an article Sullivan quoted the President, who said, "I know this is highly unusual, but I understand Buddy Ebsen has a musical playing out there called Turn to the Right that you wrote a nice review of in the paper. I just wonder if there isn't some way you could let people know that I sure hope it's still playing next time I get home so I can see it." Sullivan said he and the President had a "nice conversation", but that it did become heated. Sullivan replied to the president, "I'm ashamed of you. Here you go around cutting the arts programs, and now you go around plugging a show." The President answered, "I'm rather sorry you feel that way." They went on to discuss how arts programs were funded. Reagan mentioned "boondoggles" that were funded by the National Endowment for the Arts, such as one word poems, and performances staged in laundromats. Sullivan pointed out that there were multi-billion dollar boondoggles in the defense department budget, and the President concurred. The budget for the arts endowment that year was about $165 million. Sullivan mentioned that his original review was not a rave. "It's a pleasantly engendered nostalgic musical that didn't sustain the mood because it was so badly put together," he said. "You can't totally hate it. It's harmless. But you can't constantly eat peach ice cream in the theater without getting sick on it." "FOLLOW UP ON THE NEWS; Upstaging Reagan". New York Times. April 19, 1981

Academic work and conferences

Sullivan was devoted to mentoring and teaching theater writers, and was a founding member of the Critics Institute, which in 1968 became part of the annual Playwrights Conference of Eugene O'Neill Theater Center. The conference is a place where playwrights, actors, and directors gather, and where playwrights learn their craft as new plays are read and developed. Jones, Chris. "Dan Sullivan: Friend of Audiences, Mentor of Critics;Theater critic for the Los Angeles Times for 22 years, and longtime leader of the O’Neill Critics Institute, Sullivan was an old school newspaperman and a tireless teacher of the craft". American Theater. October 17, 2022 The Critics Institute was founded with the belief that theater critics played a part in the theatrical experience, and could learn and benefit from the conference experience. 

At the first meeting of the Critics Institute, a play was read, and received a negative reaction from one of the critics. This angered the playwright, because he felt his play had been misunderstood.  The playwright was also bothered by the fact that Sullivan was taking notes, for his next-day column in The New York Times. In that column, Sullivan would include a description of the critical reactions to the play.

The next session of that inaugural meeting of the Critics Institute involved a different playwright; and it began with the playwright pulling out a gun, pointing it at Sullivan and his fellow critics, and saying that he was "ready for them".  This was meant as a joke, though no one laughed.  At the end of the 1968 conference the playwrights were united in opposition the inclusion of critics. Things improved as the conference continued to develop and learn, and the Critics Institute was not alone in encountering fraught relationships among the various disciplines in the conference setting. Sullivan was the director of the Critics Institute from 1999 to 2013.

Sullivan co-founded the American Theater Critics Association, and created the organization's statement of purpose: To increase communication among American theater critics, to encourage freedom of expression in the theater and theater criticism, to advance the standards of theater by advancing the standard of theater criticism, to increase public awareness of the theater as an important nation resource, and to "reaffirm the individual critic's right to disagree with his colleagues on all matters including the above".Speaking to the association in 1998, Sullivan said:

Sullivan taught arts reviewing and reporting at the University of Minnesota School of Journalism.

Personal life 
Sullivan was born in Worcester, Massachusetts, where he graduated from the College of the Holy Cross. He then attended graduate school and later became a journalism professor at the University of Minnesota.  He studied music at the University of Southern California, and then at Stamford University where he studied under Virgil Thompson. 

In 1965 Sullivan married Faith Sullivan, an author, who has won the Midwest Book Award, the Langum Prize for Historical Fiction, the Milkweed National Fiction Prize and the Ben Franklin Prize, and is a Minnesota Book Award Finalist. Her novels include: Good Night, Mr. Wodehouse (2015), Gardenias (2005), What a Woman Must Do (2002), The Empress of One (1997), The Cape Ann (1988), Mrs. Demming and The Mythical Beast (1986), Watchdog (1982) and Repent, Lanny Merkel'' (1981).  They have three children.

References

Critics employed by The New York Times
20th-century American journalists
American male journalists
21st-century American journalists
American theater critics